Fairton may refer to:

 Fairton, New Jersey, United States
 Fairton, New Zealand